Eugenio André Calesso das Neves (born 27 August 1987 in Lisbon) is a Portuguese footballer who played as a forward for club U.D. Alta de Lisboa.

External links

1987 births
Living people
Footballers from Lisbon
Portuguese footballers
Association football forwards
Cypriot First Division players
Cypriot Second Division players
Nea Salamis Famagusta FC players
AEK Larnaca FC players
Digenis Akritas Morphou FC players
Portuguese expatriate footballers
Expatriate footballers in Cyprus
Portuguese expatriate sportspeople in Cyprus
Expatriate footballers in Iraq
Akritas Chlorakas players